The March of Friuli was a Carolingian frontier march, established in 776 as the continuation of the Lombard Duchy of Friuli, established  against the Slavs and Avars. It was ceded to the Duchy of Bavaria as the March of Verona in 952. Its territory comprised parts of modern-day Italy, Slovenia and Croatia.

History
After Charlemagne had conquered the Italian Kingdom of the Lombards under King Desiderius at the Siege of Pavia in 774, he at first allowed the Lombard duke Hrodgaud to continue ruling in Friuli. 
Charlemagne attached the March of Istria to Friuli.
According to the Royal Frankish Annals, Hrodgaud two years later revolted declaring himself a King of the Lombards, whereafter Charlemagne came rushing into Italy where he routed the duke's forces and had him deposed and killed. The autonomous Lombard duchy was dissolved and incorporated into Francia.
From 776, Friuli was ruled by Frankish appointees, who continued to bear the title of a dux Foroiuliensis. 
To the former Lombard duchy he added Pannonia as an integral part of his Carolingian Empire and a bulwark against the encroachments of the Avars and the Croats.

In February 828 the last Friulian dux, Baldric, was removed from office by Emperor Louis the Pious at the Imperial diet of Aachen, as he had not been able to defend the Pannonian frontier against the troops of Khan Omurtag of Bulgaria. The duchy was divided into four counties, which in 846 were gathered together again as part of the Middle Frankish realm ruled by Louis' eldest son Emperor Lothair I. He bestowed Friuli on his brother-in-law Eberhard, of the Frankish Unruochings, with the title of dux, though his successors were called marchio: "margrave."

Eberhard's son Berengar, Friulian margrave since 874, was elected King of Italy after the deposition of Charles the Fat in 887. His election precipitated decades of contests for the throne between rival claimants. Berengar paid homage to the East Frankish king Arnulf of Carinthia, he nevertheless lost the crown to Duke Guy III of Spoleto in 889 and did not succeed in recapturing it until 905. Meanwhile, represented by his counsellor Walfred at the city of Verona, he remained master in Friuli, which was always the base of his support. After Berengar's death in 924, his partisans elected Hugh of Arles king.

King Hugh did not appoint a new margrave and the march lay vacant. It remained a political division of the Frankish Kingdom of Italy until the usurpation of the throne by Berengar II upon the death of Hugh's son King Lothair II in 950. Summoned by Lothair's widow Adelaide of Burgundy, the German king Otto I took the chance to conquer Italy, depose Berengar II and to marry Adelaide. The conflict was settled at the 952 diet of Augsburg, where Berengar II was allowed to retain the royal title as a German vassal, but had to cede Friuli as the March of Verona to Duke Henry I of Bavaria, brother of King Otto I. On February 2, 962 Otto was crowned Holy Roman Emperor at Rome, deposed King Berengar II and had him arrested and exiled one year later. His remaining Italian kingdom became a constituent part of the Holy Roman Empire.

The Veronese march was held by the Carinthian dukes from 976 well into the High Middle Ages. In 1077 King Henry IV of Germany vested the Patriarchate of Aquileia with the Friulian territory east of the Tagliamento river.

Governors

Dukes
 776–787 Marcarius
 789–799 Eric
 799–808 Hunfrid
 808–817 Aio
 817–819 Cadalaus
 819–828 Balderic

Margraves
 830–866 Eberhard (also dux Foroiuli)
 866–874 Unroch (III)
 874–890 Berengar, also Holy Roman Emperor
 891–896 Walfred
 896–924 Berengar, also Holy Roman Emperor
 924–952 Berengar II

Sources
 Hodgkin, Thomas. Italy and her Invaders. Clarendon Press: 1895.

Friuli, March of
Carolingian marches
Friuli, March of
Medieval Slovenia
9th century in Italy
10th century in Italy
776 establishments
States and territories established in the 770s
828 disestablishments
States and territories disestablished in the 820s
846 establishments
States and territories established in the 840s